Carina van Zijl (born 20 May 1975) is a South African former field hockey player who competed in the 2000 Summer Olympics.

References

External links

1975 births
Living people
Afrikaner people
South African female field hockey players
Olympic field hockey players of South Africa
Field hockey players at the 2000 Summer Olympics
Field hockey players at the 1998 Commonwealth Games
Commonwealth Games competitors for South Africa